Animal Logic is a band formed in 1987 by drummer Stewart Copeland, bassist Stanley Clarke, and singer-songwriter Deborah Holland. The group recorded two albums under the auspices of manager Miles Copeland III before disbanding.

History

Formation and tour of Brazil (1987–1988)
In 1987 Stewart Copeland was working on the opera Holy Blood and Crescent Moon and found himself missing pop music. Along with bassist Stanley Clarke, he decided to form a band centered around a female singer. They found Deborah Holland after an extensive search, having received her tape from publisher Dan Howell.

In November 1987, they embarked on a short tour of Brazil under the band name Rush Hour, with Copeland's former bandmate in The Police, Andy Summers, playing guitar. Summers, who was reluctant to join a group that would attract so many comparisons to The Police, quit the band after the tour ended in order to promote his solo works.

Animal Logic album (1989)
Copeland and Clarke financed the recording of the band's debut album, and began showcasing for labels. They eventually signed with I.R.S. Records, which was headed by Copeland's brother Miles.

The band adopted the name Animal Logic after Miles Copeland misheard the lyrics on a punk band's tape as "Animal logic! Animal logic!". The band thought Animal Logic described their music perfectly. After being sued for using the name of a well known band in the D.C. area, they bought the rights to use the name from the group.

The album cover depicting three dogs was a rejected cover for the Police greatest hits album Every Breath You Take: The Singles. Stewart Copeland liked it so much that he had hung it on the wall of his studio in England, and when Miles told him about the name Animal Logic, Stewart volunteered it as the cover for the debut album.

Miles Copeland envisioned recruiting a well known guitar player to record the album, and arranged a recording session with Joe Walsh, who did not show up to the studio. Michael Thompson, who had previously played in a cover band with Deborah Holland, was called in to salvage the session and played on the song "Spy In The House Of Love". Thompson was offered a spot in Animal Logic, but declined as he was just about to release his own album, Michael Thompson Band, for Geffen Records. Thompson did commit to playing on the rest of the album, as well as a three week tour of Asia. The album Animal Logic was released in 1989 on I.R.S. Records in North America, and Virgin Records in other territories.

A promotional video for "Spy in the House of Love" was released to MTV. The band performed "Spy in the House of Love" on Late Night with David Letterman on November 10, 1989, accompanied by members of Paul Shaffer and the World's Most Dangerous Band.

Animal Logic II and breakup (1991)
Animal Logic released their second album, Animal Logic II in 1991, which included a duet with Jackson Browne on "Another Place", recorded at Jackson's studio in Santa Monica. The album was promoted with a music video for “Rose Colored Glasses”, a song the band also performed on The Tonight Show Starring Johnny Carson on November 7, 1991.

Rusty Anderson, later lead guitarist for Paul McCartney, recorded and toured with the group.

Stanley Clarke was unable to tour due to his career as a film composer, which was just taking off. Rather than look for a replacement, and unable to promote the album, Animal Logic disbanded and Deborah Holland went on to pursue a solo career.

Reunions and related activity
Both Clarke and Copeland appeared on Deborah Holland’s debut solo album, Freudian Slip (1994).

On September 11, 2013, Copeland posted a Sacred Grove video on YouTube featuring an Animal Logic "reunion". Copeland, Holland and Clarke performed a new song by Holland entitled "Whipping Boy".

In January 2019, Holland posted several pictures and short videos from a new Animal Logic recording session at the Sacred Grove with Copeland and Clarke online via Facebook. On March 23, 2019 Deborah made the announcement on her official Facebook page that she was working on two new EPs – a solo release for 2020, and one with Animal Logic with no set release date. On February 25, 2020 it was announced that she would release her sixth solo album, Fine, Thank You on March 27. The six song offering features performances by Stewart Copeland on four tracks.

In a March 2020 interview with stewartcopeland.com, Deborah Holland confirmed that Animal Logic has been working on material for a new EP: "We're in the process of finishing up five songs though the bulk of the work is now on Stanley's shoulders and he has a crazy schedule so it may take a while."

In October 2022, Deborah Holland announced through Facebook that Animal Logic would be releasing two new singles, titled "Can You Tell Me," and "Ordinary."

Discography 
Studio albums
 Animal Logic (1989)
 Animal Logic II (1991)

Singles

Band members
 Stewart Copeland  – drums
 Stanley Clarke  – bass
 Deborah Holland – vocals

References

External links
 Stewart Copeland Official Website: Animal Logic
 Deborah Holland Official Website: Animal Logic

 Animal Logic fansite
 Animal Logic MySpace site

Rock music groups from California
Musical groups from Los Angeles
Musical groups established in 1987
Musical groups disestablished in 1991
Musical groups reestablished in 2013
Musical groups disestablished in 2013
Musical groups reestablished in 2020